Ana Sánchez-Colberg  is a Puerto Rican multidisciplinary artist working internationally. She has been awarded Fellowships by the Swedish Research Council, Arts Council of England, British Council amongst others. She has also been a recipient of a National Endowment for the Arts Award in 2016 and the recipient of the highly coveted MAP Funding (USA) award in 2019, among other awards and recognitions.

Career and Activities 
Since 2016 Sánchez-Colberg moves fully into non-stage multidisciplinary/cross-arts works based on experimentation with generative compositional rules to create new forms of collaborative and participatory contemporary art. The works defy categorization as they bring together elements of fine and visual art, audio composition, movement, photography and film, live documentation in works that question the relationship between art institutions, the 'art-object' and the subjects involved in the creation and reception. Her current portfolio can be seen at www.anasanchezcolberg.com.  This focus led the establishment of Vision.AI.R-e, a company developing multidisciplinary projects in audiovisual and new technologies.

Her most recent film project 13 Variables [We are no longer who we were then, in dialogue with Jean Cocteau] was an official selection for the Athens Digital Arts festival 2021 edition, ScreenDance Miami, as well as an official selection for the Berlin International Art Film Festival.  The work reimagines Cocteau's Jeune Homme et la Morte from the perspective of the Woman/Death.  Love Letters to Ana was part of exhibition Coantivirus curated by NY20+ Nongyuan Culture in Chengdu, Sichuan, China.  From there it joined the permanent collection of the channel Six Minutes Past Nine, see the full series at: https://sixminutespastnine.com . The video series is a collaborations between nine international artists during the nine-week period of 'heavy lockdown' in the city of Athens. Ana is the lead artist who invited artists in 'lockdown cities' (from Seoul to Beijing, to Bangkok, Rome, Milan, San Antonio, to name some) to send her an audio 'love letter'. This love letter was used as an audio-score to 'go on a walk' (a poetic slightly ironic variation on the museum audio walk) in the conditions of 'containment'. The letters serve as a cross-border reflection on the shared and distinct conditions of 'lockdown' as well as an exercise in 'recuperation' amidst the loss.

Event/Horizons was an international collaborative project bringing together over sixty-nine performing arts artists across the globe to share practices and concerns in response to the effect of the global pandemic.  The project lasted for thirteen months, from October 2020 to December 2021 and concluded in an installation showcasing the work that was generated through the exchange.  The archive of the full project can be seen at: https://www.eventhorizons2021.com

In February 2020 she was artistic mentor for the project Grass Stains in Miami, Fl, an initiative of Pioneer Winter Collective. This gathering of twenty-two creators worked under the mentorship and facilitation of Sánchez-Colberg, in a laboratory setting over the course of one week. The MDC Live Arts Lab surrounding MDC Wolfson Campus (Building 1) hosted the artists. The final event curated by Sánchez-Colberg can be viewed at https://vimeo.com/395733654. She will once again curate the event in March 2022.

In 2019 Ana was one of 40 awardees of the prestigious MAP Awards 2019 for the creation of the project 1[-1] Materiality of Exile in collaboration with BoxoPROJECTS. The project was part of a one-month residency at Boxo HOUSE arts centre and focused on migratory histories of the Southwest desert, with a focus on the Latinx community whose identity is marked by migrations and "crossing" through the desert. https://mapfundblog.org/1-1-map-2019/. The archive can be seen at: https://materialityofexile.blogspot.com/ . A second strand 11.11 Materiality of [Contained] Exiles was premiered in a global on-line screening 29/31 May 2020. See https://vimeo.com/showcase/6883129.

Other works include  Seven to the Seventh, an unprecedented global project that connected synchronically artists and their communities across seven time zones, using mobile technology throughout seven days 24–30 June 2019. The event was made possible with the support of the Stavros Niarchos Foundation. By the end of the week over 3.4k people had participated in the event either remotely through mobile platforms or at one of the multiple international sites. See https://vimeo.com/showcase/6273097 for the documentation of the Athens event.

J[us]t 5 in collaboration with art curators CHEAPART.GR evolved between 2017 and 2018 across various contexts including the biennale Art-Athena International Arts Fair and Return to Athens Festival. The works were a series of site-responsive public interventions throughout the city of Athens.

J[us]t 5 REDUX an immersive installation that 'collected' previous events into a single locality was presented within the Athens International Festival in June 2018.  The work interweaved the collected narratives of the artist as she travelled through various cities- each city bringing her back to her relationship with Athens- raising questions about art, her collaborators, immigrant identity, the challenges and possibilities of life in the city in this precise historical moment. The artist created the participatory event as well as composed the audio soundscape/ score that the public used to follow the event. See https://vimeo.com/channels/570376/287799153.

The project Micropolies: Invisible Cities (February – May 2019) consisted of a series of public participatory interventions in the cities of Byblos (Lebanon), San Juan (Puerto Rico), Miami (Florida USA), Stockholm (Sweden), Athens (Greece).  The project dispensed with the presence of the artist, the general public was invited to gather and 'perform' invisible solos by following an audio score (created by the artist) and a task score delivered through mobile technologies. See https://vimeo.com/showcase/6352708

The Sky Leans on Me, (me the one horizontal amongst all the verticals) created as part of the Benaki Museum, Athens Out/topias Exhibition, the largest European exhibition that year on art in public and outside spaces (see: https://vimeo.com/210896650) in November 2016. The work was an open invitation to participate in rethinking the public nature of the museum space and consider ways in which the art form is held between the artist (who opens the space) and the audience (invited to inhabit and transform it).

Sánchez-Colberg was the founder and director of Theatre enCorps, a UK based dance theatre company between 1989-2021. www.theatreencorpscollectif.com.

Sánchez-Colberg has worked with many international companies.  She has produced four commissioned pieces for Ballet Concierto de Puerto Rico:  Ojos Que No Ven (1992), which received the first prize in the Festival of Caribbean Choreographers and has been subsequently performed as part of Ballet Concierto's performances in New York's Lincoln Center and the Wuppertal Opera House, Sartorii (1994), Entre Huella y Pisada (1996), which received various awards from the Corporation for Music and Scenic Arts (NEA), and Tejiendo Memorias (1998).  She produced a piece for the ballet of the Staatstheater Cottbus, es lasst sich nicht lesen.. with support from the British Council (Berlin).  Strange Muse, produced in June 1997, was commissioned by the Institute of Culture of Puerto Rico in collaboration with musicians from the Puerto Rico Philharmonic Orchestra.  In 1997 she premiered a work for Foreign Bodies Dance Company developed with support from East Midlands Arts. She has also choreographed Recollections (1999) for Andanza (Puerto Rico), and Cuerpos (no) Mienten (2012) a group dance for seven dancers with an original composition by composer Kiriakos Spirou for three pianos for CoDA 21 (Puerto Rico). She is currently resident choreographer with Andanza, Contemporary Dance Company of Puerto Rico where she has choreographed Janus (2022) and Tales of Mother Goose (2022), a collaboration with the Symphony Orchestra of Puerto Rico. With Andanza, she is currently establishing Festival Video [An]Danza International, an annual video dance and dance on screen festival.  The first edition of the festival is set for March 17-19 2023, in collaboration with the Faculty of the Humanities University of Puerto Rico- Rio Piedras. 

Sánchez-Colberg has collaborated with filmmaker Chris Clow in film and documentary projects that aim to capture the intuitive and ephemeral moments that lead to works of dance. These include Mahler's fifths (2005) Holds No Memory (2005, stage 1) 2006 part 1, 2006 part 2 and We: Implicated and Complicated (2007). The documentary film of the creative process into 45, 46, 47 The Unbearable was premiered at Kinitiras Studio-Residency Centre, Athens on 16 March 2011.

Artistic Research and Pedagogy 
Sánchez-Colberg is a guest teacher in dance schools and festivals and has taught in the Tanzwochen/Vienna, International Festival of Theatre in Bogota, Colombia, Helsinki Theatre Academy, University College Dance Stockholm, and the Hong Kong Academy of Performing Arts, amongst others. She has worked at centres for dance and theatre training, including the Laban Centre for Movement and Dance (now Trinity/Laban, the Royal Central School of Speech and Drama, Helsinki Theatre Academy, and most recently the University of the Arts Department of Dance and Circus  in Stockholm where she has held the position of Visiting Professor of Choreography and Composition 2006–2013 and Programme Coordinator of the MA Contemporary Circus Practices 2020-2022.  She was also Visiting  Professor of Theatre at the Estonia Academy of Music and Theatre contributing to the MA Contemporary Physical Performance Practices and the MPhi/PhD Research degrees.

Her publications can be accessed at https://www.researchgate.net/profile/Ana_Sanchez-Colberg

Work in Theatre and Performance 
Sánchez-Colberg also has a track record in work in theatre and performance.  Sánchez-Colberg holds a BA (Hons) Theatre Arts, Magna Cum Laude (with a double major in Drama Literature-20th Century ) from the University of Pennsylvania.  As part of the work towards the honours, she followed an independent programme of study leading to a dissertation looking at the 'birth' of physical theatre in relation to changes to theatre and dance practices stemming from the avant-garde of the early 1900s in Europe. The work looked in detail at practitioners such as Meyerhold, Copeau, Checkhov, Lecoq, Artaud and Grotowski. The research had a practical dimension in collaboration with the physical theatre company 'Intuitions', a devised-performance based on Euripide's Bacchae for which she did the movement direction as well as played the lead role of Dyonisus.

As movement director for Intuitions, she was involved in three major productions: Alice in Wonderland (1983) (based on the Andre Gregory Performance Garage text of the 1970s), Bacchae – in 84, and Buchner's Woyzzeck(1984). She has also worked with London-based Rougue 28 Theatre Company as performer and movement advisor between 2006 and 2008. Sánchez-Colberg was course leader of the MA Performance Practices and Research at Central School of Speech and Drama (2005–2008), the largest conservatory of drama and theatre in the UK. The MA focusses on physical and interdisciplinary based performance. During this time she was leader of the Dramaturgy strand of the MA Advanced Theatre Practices as well as contributed to various modules in the MA Movement Direction, MA Classical Acting and MA Musical Theatre. She was also PhD supervisor to various theatre and performance research projects ranging from interdisciplinary approaches to puppetry and dance to re-examination of Laban's work in dialogue with the philosophy of Aristotle.

Her approach to movement for performance is based on Laban's principles, in particularly an understanding of the infinite possibilities of movement that are available both through the 'body's own terms' as well as in relation to working with text – devised and classical.  The approach is not one that seeks to establish a movement language based on external repetition of movement patterns or effort/psychological traits, but rather one that seeks to develop the performer as an 'articulate subject' with physical, dynamic, mental and emotive dimensions all which play a role in the creation of the work.  Importantly the training is organised under the framework of a 'laboratory' of movement exploration, bringing forward the idea of 'what if...' to bear upon the treatment of the materiality of the body. The emphasis is on engaging creatively in process based work whilst acquiring precise physical skills (core stability, flexibility, dynamic range, effective use of breath for movement and voice, understanding the poetics of the body-in-space and space-of-the body). However, different to the 'tradition' of 'Laban for actors' which remain rooted in 'character' and therefore addresses the actor/text/director relationship) she brings to the foreground the lesser known aspects of Laban's work and that is the study of 'making space' (choreutics).  This angle aligns the work of the performer to the work of the scenographer/dramaturg through a consideration of how the body in motion shapes an invisible scenographic dramaturgy.  The training aims to draw awareness to the dynamic and shifting design of the 'lived' space [through spatial parameters that include progression, projection, tension] created through spatial relationships between the performers to each other and simultaneously to everything that is a 'body' on stage (in the architectural sense, everything that occupies/delineates space is a 'body')- props, scenography elements, light.  Therefore, in training for 'movement' the student of theatre and performance is confronted with the totality of the stage world, the training goes beyond movement as a subtext for plot and 'characterization'.  Sánchez-Colberg position as an expert practitioner in theatre is confirmed by the many invitations to teach at important international fora as well as the track record of external examination in the area of movement for actors -including examination of PhD level work- at Rose Bruford College (UK), Chichester University (UK), Dartington College (UK), Brunell University (UK), University of Canterbury (UK), Helsinki Theatre Academy (FI).

She is the author of the seminal essay defining physical theatre practice Altered States and Sublimal Spaces: Charting the Road towards a Physical Theatre. First published in the journal Performance Research in 1996, the essay is now included in the reader Physical Theatres:  A Critical Reader, edited by John Keefe and Simon Murray.  She is the co-author of Dance and The Performative, a key text in dance studies world-wide.

As part of her position of Professor of Choreography and Composition at the University Dance and Circus Stockholm (2008–2013), Sánchez-Colberg worked in various interdisciplinary projects between dance and new circus.  She supervised John Paul Zaccarini, the first PhD candidate in a practice based dissertation in (new) Circus in 2013. She currently coordinates the MA in Contemporary Circus Practices at University of the Arts, Stockholm.

References

External links
www.anasanchezcolberg.co – current artistic portfolio
 http://theatreencorpscollectif.com – the official website of Theatre enCorps Collectif
 https://vimeo.com/user8192950 – the vimeo channel of the company
 https://filmfreeway.com/FestvalVideoAnDanzaInternacional

Living people
1962 births
Puerto Rican dancers
Modern dancers
Female dancers
Jacksonville University faculty